Anna Sui is a 2009 book written by Susan Muaddi Darraj and published by Infobase Publishing as an inspirational reference for aspiring young women in a series by Infobase called Asian Americans of Achievement. The book documents the early life and early career of fashion designer Anna Sui.

Content 
The book is written as inspirational reference for young women and girls aspiring to go into the fashion industry or otherwise. The book details Sui's upbringing in a Chinese-American family and how the designer overcame initial doubts over her choice of career. It goes on to document Sui's rise in the industry and a few of the pivotal situations that led to it, stressing the need to be prepared for the situations that life presents, the importance of perseverance and not letting go of one's dreams. The book specifically documents Sui's encounters and interactions with Madonna, Paris Hilton, Linda Evangelista and Christy Turlington amongst others.

Reviews 
Reviews for the book were generally positive with Booklist via Amazon giving the book 7 out of 10 and Goodreads giving it 3.5 stars out of 5.

See also 
 History of fashion design
 Anna Sui
 Susan Muaddi Darraj
 Infobase Publishing

References 

2009 non-fiction books
Autobiographies